Home Nations is a collective term with one of two meanings depending on context. Politically it means the nations of the constituent countries of the United Kingdom (England, Northern Ireland, Scotland, and Wales). In sport, if a sport is governed by a council representing the island of Ireland, such as the Irish Rugby Football Union (IRFU), the term can refer to the nations of the constituent countries on the island of Great Britain (England, Scotland and Wales) and the Irish nation by British media outlets, although it is not favoured in Ireland due to colonial connotations.

The term was originally used when the whole island of Ireland was part of the United Kingdom. The synonymous "Home Countries" (not to be confused with the "home counties") is also sometimes used.

Association football

In association football, the Home Nations originally referred to the then four national teams of the United Kingdom: England, Ireland, Scotland and Wales. Today, the term refers to the teams of England, Northern Ireland, Scotland and Wales – the teams that contested the British Home Championship until 1984 – although references to the Home Nations sometimes erroneously include the Republic of Ireland team.

In the Summer Olympics, a single Great Britain team has always represented the UK as a whole with the team winning gold in 1900, 1908, and 1912. This was the case until the 1976 Summer Olympics when a dispute arose with the football associations of Scotland, Wales, and Northern Ireland complaining about equal representation within the GB squad.

Ahead of the 2012 Summer Olympics, a debate took place amongst the football associations that govern the sport in England, Scotland, Wales and Northern Ireland, over whether they would allow their members to participate in the event as a single UK team due to the fact the UK was hosting the tournament. The English Football Association, the only association in favour of participation, and the news media used the term Home Nations to describe the parties to the debate. Eventually an agreement was reached for a united Great Britain team to compete, with the men's team consisting of English and Welsh players only, and the women's team consisting of English and Scottish players (nb: A Northern Irish player was listed as a reserve). In regards to the men's tournament, the Football Association of Wales opposed to the idea of a single UK team but decided against sanctioning any players wishing to participate.

With the relative success of London 2012, with both sides reaching their respective quarter finals, it was hoped that Great Britain could regularly compete in Olympic football again ahead of the 2016 Games, however no agreement between the four football associations was reached. Ahead of the 2020 Games, an agreement was reached for a women's team to compete in the event based on the qualification ability of a predetermined Home Nation. The agreed Home Nation was England, and should England have qualified via their placement at the 2019 World Cup, Great Britain would be allowed entry into the event. England qualified Great Britain at the 2019 World Cup, which saw Great Britain reach the quarter finals for a second time at the 2020 Olympics.

Cricket

Cricket in the British Isles is governed independently by the home nations except with a unity between England and Wales. The England and Wales Cricket Board organise domestic competitions and the England cricket team which, despite its name, is the national cricket team of England and Wales. Despite this there is a Wales national cricket team but this is more of a ceremonial team and doesn't regularly compete in international tournaments. Cricket in Ireland is operated on an all-Ireland basis.

Field hockey

Different field hockey competition see a different team split within the UK and Ireland. Some competitions see a United Kingdom and Republic of Ireland split, whereas others see a England, Scotland, Wales, and all-Ireland split.

Rowing

The Home International Regatta is a rowing regatta held every year for the countries of England, Ireland, Scotland, and Wales. Events are held for both men and women at junior (under 18) and senior levels, including Para-rowing events. The race has been held since 1962 and each country takes it in turns to host the event. Rowing Ireland is operated on an all-Ireland basis. In almost all other international regattas representatives from England, Scotland, Wales and Northern Ireland compete for 'Team GB' which represents Great Britain and Northern Ireland. Rowers from Northern Ireland can opt to represent either Ireland or Great Britain in international competition - several of whom have represented both at different times during their careers.

Rugby league

Historically, Great Britain ran one unified national team, the GB Lions administered by one governing body for Great Britain – the Rugby Football League. In 1995 the GB Lions began competing less in major tournaments in favour of the home nations of England, Scotland, and Wales competing individually. Scotland Rugby League and Wales Rugby League eventually formed to administered the respective national sides with the RFL becoming the governing Body for England. The RFL still had a large amount of control over the domestic league in Scotland and Wales due to the domestic system being a British rugby league system. However this control is somewhat non-existent in Scotland due to no Scottish teams having ever played in the top three tiers of the system. Rugby league in Ireland has always been separate, being governed by Rugby League Ireland on an all-Ireland basis.

The Amateur Four Nations competition in rugby league, run annually from 2002 to 2007 for the A sides of Wales, England, Scotland and Ireland, was also referred to as the "home nations championship".

Rugby union

In 1883, the first Home Nations Championship was played between England, Ireland, Scotland and Wales. At this point in its history, the competition contained only teams from the UK. In 1910, France officially joined the competition and it was renamed the Five Nations Championship.  Despite the partition of Ireland and the secession of the Republic of Ireland from the United Kingdom, the island of Ireland still fields a single sports team and is referred to as a Home Nation in the context of rugby union. When France was expelled from the international championship in 1932, the tournament reverted to being known simply as the Home Nations tournament until the readmission of France immediately after the 1939 tournament, just before World War II caused its suspension until 1947. Since the admission of Italy in 2000, the tournament has been known by its current name, the Six Nations Championship.

Victories by any Home Nation over all of the other three Home Nations in one Championship season is a Triple Crown. The Home Nations also contribute players to a unified team known as the British and Irish Lions. Southern Hemisphere teams who beat all four home nations in one tour are said to have a Grand Slam Tour.

See also
 All-Ireland
 Countries of the United Kingdom
 Sport in the United Kingdom
 Terminology of the British Isles

References

Politics of the United Kingdom
Sport in England
Sport in Ireland
Sport in Northern Ireland
Sport in the Republic of Ireland
Sport in Scotland
Sport in Wales
Sport in the United Kingdom
Terminology of the British Isles